Statue of Nathan Hale may refer to:

 Captain Nathan Hale (statue)
 Nathan Hale (statue)